Utah Utes women's soccer represents the University of Utah in the Pac-12 Conference of NCAA Division I soccer. The team is coached by Rich Manning. The team plays its home games at Ute Soccer Field.

History
Utah women's soccer began as an NCAA-affiliated program in the 1995–96 school year when the Western Athletic Conference began to sponsor women's soccer. The program earned its first NCAA tournament bid in 2002.

All-time record

References

 
1995 establishments in Utah
NCAA Division I women's soccer teams
Pac-12 Conference women's soccer
Soccer clubs in Utah
Association football clubs established in 1995